Máel Muad mac Brain (died 978), commonly anglicised Molloy, was King of Munster, first possibly from 959  or alternatively 963 to around 970, when he may have been deposed (usurped) by Mathgamain mac Cennétig of the Dál gCais, and then again from 976, following his putting to death of the latter, until his own death in the Battle of Belach Lechta against Mathgamain's brother Brian Bóruma in 978. From around 970 to 976, he is referred to in the sources only as King of Desmond (also known as "lord of Desmumu"), but remained "in opposition" to Mathgamain throughout his career. Máel Muad's chief ally in Munster was Donnubán mac Cathail, to whom he partly owed his second reign, and with whom he is also associated earlier. Along with Donnubán he was also allied, according to the not contemporary saga and political tract Cogad Gáedel re Gallaib, with Ivar of Limerick, who may himself have temporarily been overlord of the province.

Máel Muad belonged to the Uí Echach Muman or Eóganacht Raithlind and is an ancestor of the medieval and modern O'Mahony family. His last ancestor to be King of Munster was Feidlimid mac Tigernaig.

His son Cian mac Máelmuaid became a close ally of Brian, allegedly marrying his daughter Sadb, according to late traditions.

Notes

References

 Green, Alice Stopford, History of the Irish State to 1014. London: Macmillan. 1925.
 Ó Corráin, Donnchadh, Ireland Before the Normans. Gill and Macmillan. 1972.
 O'Donovan, John (ed. & tr.), Annala Rioghachta Eireann. Annals of the Kingdom of Ireland by the Four Masters. 7 vols. Dublin: Royal Irish Academy. 1848–51. 2nd edition, 1856. Volume II
 O'Mahony, John, "A History of the O'Mahony septs of Kinelmeky and Ivagha", in Journal of the Cork Historical and Archaeological Society, Volumes 12–16, Second Series. 1906–1910.
 Ó Murchadha, Diarmuid, Family Names of County Cork. Cork: The Collins Press. 2nd edition, 1996.
 Todd, James Henthorn (ed. & tr.). Cogadh Gaedhel re Gallaibh: The War of the Gaedhil with the Gaill. London: Longmans. 1867.
 
 O'Brien, John and John Conry, Dublin Annals of Inisfallen (see O'Donovan)

10th-century Irish monarchs
Kings of Munster
978 deaths
Year of birth unknown